"Raghupati Raghava Raja Ram" (also called Ram Dhun) is a bhajan (devotional song) widely popularised by Mahatma Gandhi and set to tune by Vishnu Digambar Paluskar in Raga Mishra Gara.

History 
The precise origins of the song are not entirely clear. It is believed to have been either written by Tulsidas (or based on his work Ramcharitmanas) or based on a 17th-century sung-prayer by the Marathi saint-poet Ramdas.

Anthony Parel writes in Gandhi's Philosophy and the Quest for Harmony,

There have been many versions of the Ramdhun, and the version that Mahatma Gandhi used had an "ecumenical flavour" to it. Gandhi modified the original bhajan, adding that the Ishwar of the Hindus and the Allah of the Muslims were one and the same, to make the song more secular-looking and to spread the message of reconciliation between Hindus and Muslims. The song was extensively used to project a secular and composite vision of Indian society — it was sung during the 1930 Salt March.

Lyrics

In popular culture

 Elements of the chant were included in the song "Utho Utho he Bharat" in the movie Bharat Milap (1942), in songs of Shri Ram Bhakta Hanuman (1948), the song "De Dii Hamen Aazaadii" in the movie Jagriti (1954), Purab Aur Paschim (1970) and in the film Kuch Kuch Hota Hai (1998), in the Kannada film Gandhinagara (1968), in the British-Indian movie Gandhi (1982), in the film Gandhi, My Father (2007), in Satyagraha (2013), and also in Krrish 3 (2013).
 The song is an important motif in the 2006 Bollywood film, Lage Raho Munna Bhai, and is featured in the movie.
 Raghupathi Raghavan Rajaram was the title of a Tamil movie produced in 1977. 
 Pete Seeger included "Raghupati Raghava Raja Ram" on his album "Strangers and Cousins" (1964) and performed it in Episode 10 of his television series Rainbow Quest.
 Sheila Chandra recorded a version titled Bhajan on her 1992 album Weaving My Ancestors' Voices.
 Many singers such as Lata Mangeshkar, Jagjit Singh, K.S.Chithra have recorded the song.
 The game Grand Theft Auto: Liberty City Stories featured Ananda Shankar's version on one of the in-game radio stations, "Radio del Mundo".
 The song also features in the A.R. Rahman composed soundtrack of the 2023 Indian film Gandhi Godse: Ek Yudh.

See also
 Vaishnava Jana To
 Hari Tuma Haro
 Hanuman Chalisa
 Shri Ramachandra Kripalu
 Thumak Chalat Ram Chandra

References

Bibliography

Hindu music
Vaishnavism
Cultural depictions of Mahatma Gandhi
Bhakti movement
Bhajan
Hindu devotional songs